

431001–431100 

|-bgcolor=#f2f2f2
| colspan=4 align=center | 
|}

431101–431200 

|-bgcolor=#f2f2f2
| colspan=4 align=center | 
|}

431201–431300 

|-bgcolor=#f2f2f2
| colspan=4 align=center | 
|}

431301–431400 

|-id=397
| 431397 Carolinregina ||  || Carolin Regina Hormuth (born 1985, née Schnupp) studied stellar and substellar companions around exoplanet host stars at Heidelberg University, and wife of German discoverer Felix Hormuth || 
|}

431401–431500 

|-id=436
| 431436 Gahberg ||  || Gahberg, an 864-meter high mountain close to the Alps, located near Weyregg on Lake Attersee in Austria || 
|}

431501–431600 

|-bgcolor=#f2f2f2
| colspan=4 align=center | 
|}

431601–431700 

|-bgcolor=#f2f2f2
| colspan=4 align=center | 
|}

431701–431800 

|-bgcolor=#f2f2f2
| colspan=4 align=center | 
|}

431801–431900 

|-bgcolor=#f2f2f2
| colspan=4 align=center | 
|}

431901–432000 

|-bgcolor=#f2f2f2
| colspan=4 align=center | 
|}

References 

431001-432000